Wolfgang Glück (born 29 September 1929, Vienna, Austria) is an Austrian film director and screenwriter. His film '38 – Vienna Before the Fall (1987) was nominated for the Academy Award for Best Foreign Language Film at the 59th Academy Awards.

Selected filmography
As director
 Endangered Girls (1958)
 Girls for the Mambo-Bar (1959)
 Traumnovelle (1969, TV film) — (based on Dream Story)
 Doppelspiel in Paris (1972, TV film)
 Agent aus der Retorte (1972, TV film)
 The Count of Luxemburg (1972) — (based on Der Graf von Luxemburg)
 Wunschloses Unglück (1974, TV film) — (based on A Sorrow Beyond Dreams)
  (1976, TV film) — (based on a short story by Ingeborg Bachmann)
  (1978, TV film) — (based on short stories by O. Henry, P. G. Wodehouse and W. Somerset Maugham)
  (1981) — (based on a novel by Friedrich Torberg)
 Tatort: Mord in der Oper (1981, TV series episode)
 Brigitta (1982, TV film) — (based on Brigitta)
 '38 – Vienna Before the Fall (1987) — (based on a novel by Friedrich Torberg)
As actor
 Adventure in Vienna (1952)
 Red Sun (1970), as Mercedes driver
 Funny Games (1997), as Robert

References

External links
 

1929 births
Living people
Austrian film directors
Austrian screenwriters
Austrian male screenwriters
Film people from Vienna
Austrian television directors